Maraea Rakuraku is a Māori playwright, poet, short story writer, and broadcaster from Aotearoa (New Zealand) who is also working on her first full-length novel. Rakuraku belongs to the Ngāi Tūhoe (Tūhoe iwi, “tribe”). She is a doctoral student in the International Institute of Modern Letters of Victoria University of Wellington, where she earned an MA in 2016.

Rakuraku works to provide space for those peoples who sit on the margins while exploring the continued impact of colonialism in 21st Century Aotearoa.

Radio
Rakuraku's love for National radio emerged in her youth as she grew up listening to children's programs every Sunday. In her time at Canterbury University she began broadcasting on the Māori students’ radio show. Several years and degrees later, while living in Auckland, Rakuraku completed two years as a volunteer for a talkback (Nga Mane Aute) at Radio Waatea. Later, she spent some time hosting a three-hour program on KFM Radio. In 2006, Maraea joined Radio New Zealand as co-producer and presenter of the Kaupapa Māori programme Te Ahi Kaa, sharing the role with Justine Murray.

Plays
Rakuraku's first full-length play The Prospect was awarded three Chapman Tripp Theatre Awards in 2012, including New Playwright of the Year. In 2012, Rakuraku also took home the annual Tau Mai e Kapiti Writer in Residence award. The play explores the trauma of colonization: “'How one culture assimilates another and the trail of destruction wrought as a result.' And there are moments that also echo the atrocities and justifications wrought by fundamentalism in every guise around the world and throughout history. In short, The Prospect proves how universal a culturally specific story can be. As for the prospects for our futures – that's up to us all, and seeing this play will contribute greatly to our collective understanding, as well as giving us a rich and insightful theatrical experience."

Rakuraku's second play, Tan-Knee, is the first of a planned trilogy, about a family of the Tūhoe iwi (tribe). After returning home from a successful boxing career, Tū is planning to re-open the Boxing Gym Muhammad's in his home town with his brother Pōtiki and their cousin Eunice. Twenty years have passed since Tū was last home and the town of Taneatua, known as Tan-Knee, is not as he remembers it.
Rakuraku wrote the play in response to the 2007 raids of Te Urewera areas and lock downs by the State and the ongoing objectification of the Tūhoe iwi in the media. 
For this play she was awarded the Adam NZ Play Award in 2016. She also received awards for Best Play by a Māori Writer and Best Play by a Women Writer.

For her third play, Te Papakāinga, Rakuraku again won the Adam award for best playwright. The play (which also served as Rakuraku's master's thesis) concerns the effect of a child's death on a Māori village struggling with the effects of colonisation.

Poetry
Rakuraku is the co-editor of a book of Māori poetry in translation into English, Tātai Whetū: Seven Māori Women Poets in Translation, which also features some of her own poetry.

References 

Year of birth missing (living people)
Living people
21st-century New Zealand dramatists and playwrights
New Zealand women poets
New Zealand Māori writers
Ngāi Tūhoe people
International Institute of Modern Letters alumni
New Zealand women dramatists and playwrights
21st-century New Zealand women writers
21st-century New Zealand poets